Scratchappyland contains selections from the Scratchcratchratchatch mixtape. It was released in 10" format by Ninja Tune (ZEN10KK). Due to heavy use of unlicensed samples, the 10" has a label with 'for promotional use only - not for resale' printed on it.

Track listing
Side A
 "Start Hear"
 "Dinner With Yoda"
 "Statics Waltz (Lo-Fi Version)"
 "Tricks N' Treats"

Side B
 "Made From Scratch"
 "Jhaptal"
 "Taboo Soda"
 "Almost Easy Listening"
 "The Mushroom Factory"
 "Thank You, Good Night, Drive Safely"

External links 
 Album at Ninja Tune

References

Kid Koala albums
1996 albums
Ninja Tune albums